Sultan Mahamed Abdiqadir (died 12 February 2021) was the eighth Grand Sultan of the Isaaq Sultanate.

Mahamed Abdiqadir died on 12 February 2021, in Hargeisa, the capital of Somaliland due to an illness he was suffering from for months. A state funeral was held and was attended by the President of Somaliland Muse Bihi Abdi and the chairmen of the two opposition parties in the country, as well as high officials and ordinary citizens. The head of the UK's liaison in Somaliland was also among the dignitaries to pay his respects to the late sultan.

Per Isaaq tradition, his son Daud was named as the ninth Isaaq sultan before his body was laid to rest.

References 

21st-century Somalian people
20th-century Somalian people
Somalian Muslims
Somali sultans
Grand Sultans of the Isaaq Sultanate
2021 deaths
Year of birth missing
People from Hargeisa